Michael John Flynn,  (born 1960) is one of the British Army's most decorated members in recent years.

Flynn was born in Cardiff, Wales, in 1960. He joined the British Army and served in the Blues and Royals. He has seen active service in Northern Ireland, the Falklands War, the Bosnian War, the Iraq War and the War in Afghanistan. In 2003 he was awarded the Conspicuous Gallantry Cross as a lance corporal of horse when serving with D Squadron, Blues and Royals in Iraq. In August 2006 Corporal of Horse Flynn was awarded the Military Cross in Helmand province, southern Afghanistan, in action against the Taliban.

References

Further reading

External links
 Flynn's account of Afghanistan, The Guardian; 17 November 2006; accessed 11 February 2014.

British Army personnel of the War in Afghanistan (2001–2021)
Recipients of the Conspicuous Gallantry Cross
Recipients of the Military Cross
Living people
Blues and Royals soldiers
Military personnel from Cardiff
British Army personnel of the Iraq War
British Army personnel of the Falklands War
British people of Irish descent
1960 births
Date of birth missing (living people)